The River Isla is a tributary of the River Tay in Angus and Perthshire, Scotland. It runs for 46 miles (74 km) through the Kirkton of Glenisla (Clachan Ghlinn Ìle) and Strathmore (An Srath Mòr).

Gallery

See also
Eassie Stone
Kilry Glen
Kinloch

References

Isla
Isla
1Isla